A subfield of fluid statics, aerostatics is the study of gases that are not in motion with respect to the coordinate system in which they are considered. The corresponding study of gases in motion is called aerodynamics.

Aerostatics studies density allocation, especially in air. One of the applications of this is the barometric formula.

An aerostat is a lighter than air craft, such as an airship or balloon, which uses the principles of aerostatics to float.

Basic laws 

Treatment of the equations of gaseous behaviour at rest is generally taken, as in hydrostatics, to begin with a consideration of the general equations of momentum for fluid flow, which can be expressed as:

,

As the fluid's static nature mandates that , and that , the following set of partial differential equations representing the basic equations of aerostatics is found.

However, the presence of a non-constant density as is found in gaseous fluid systems (due to the compressibility of gases) requires the inclusion of the ideal gas law:

,

where  denotes the universal gas constant, and  the temperature of the gas, in order to render the valid aerostatic partial differential equations:

,

which can be employed to compute the pressure distribution in gases whose thermodynamic states are given by the equation of state for ideal gases.

Fields of study 
 Atmospheric pressure fluctuation
 Composition of mountain air
 Cross-section of the atmosphere
 Gas density
 Gas diffusion in soil
 Gas pressure
 Kinetic theory of gases
 Partial pressures in gas mixtures
 Pressure measurement

See also 
 Aeronautics

References

Fluid mechanics
Aerodynamics